The Chevrolet Uplander is a minivan manufactured and marketed by the Chevrolet division of General Motors for  model years of 2005-2009, replacing the Venture and the Astro. Marketed over a single generation, the Uplander was offered in short and long wheelbase variations — each with foldable and removable second and third row  seating; a V-6 engine and 4-speed automatic transmission.

Heavily based on GM's predecessor minivans, the Uplander was initially marketed with those vehicles, the Venture and Astro.  The minivan and its rebadged variants, the Saturn Relay, Buick Terraza, and Pontiac Montana SV6, were manufactured at GM's Doraville Assembly and were discontinued in 2008 when GM left the minivan market, ended production and closed the Doraville Assembly plant.

The Uplander was marketed in the United States, Canada, Chile, Mexico, and the Middle East.

Year to year changes
2005: The Uplander was initially offered with a 3.5 L High Value 3500 LX9 V6 generating 200 hp (149 kW) and 220 lb·ft (298 N·m).
2006: A 3.9 L LZ9 V6, with 240 hp (179 kW) and 240 lb·ft (332 Nm) torque, was added as an option.  Wheels were changed from a five-lugnut design to a six-lugnut design. The GM logo was added to the front doors. A short-wheelbase model became available, but only for the fleet market.
2007: The 3.5 L V6 was dropped, leaving the 3.9 L as the base engine. Consequently, the optional AWD system was also dropped, since it could not handle the torque of the 3.9 L engine. A flex-fuel version of the 3.9 L V6 also became available for 2007.
2008: The Uplander's last year for the United States, although production continued for export to Canada and Mexico up to the 2009 model year. The final vehicle (a 2009 Canadian-specification short wheelbase Pontiac Montana SV6 in Liquid Silver Metallic with a roof rack) rolled off the Doraville assembly line on September 26, 2008.

Safety
According to the Insurance Institute for Highway Safety, the Chevrolet Uplander has an improved crash test rating than its predecessor, the Venture. The Uplander, Pontiac Montana SV6, Buick Terraza, and Saturn Relay earned the highest rating of "Good" in the IIHS offset frontal crash test but was rated only "Acceptable" and "Poor" in the IIHS side crash test with and without the optional side airbags, respectively.

Sales

Gallery

References

External links
Video of Chevrolet Uplander's 5-Star Crash Test

 Video of Chevrolet Uplander's IIHS Side Crash Test Without Optional Side Airbags

All-wheel-drive vehicles
Uplander
Front-wheel-drive vehicles
Minivans
Cars introduced in 2005
Motor vehicles manufactured in the United States